The following radio stations broadcast on AM frequency 1053 kHz:

Australia
2CA in Canberra, Australian Capital Territory (C-QUAM AM stereo)

China 
 CNR Senior Citizen Radio in Beijing

Japan
JOAR: Nagoya

Russian Federation
Radio Maria (Saint-Petersburg)

United Kingdom
Talksport

References

Lists of radio stations by frequency